"At Night" is a song by Swiss house music project Shakedown, featuring vocals from American singer Terra Deva. Released on 29 April 2002, it reached number six on the UK Singles Chart and number one on the UK Dance Chart in May 2002. The song was a minor hit in the rest of Europe except Greece, where it reached number five.

Music video
The music video features an escaped convict going into the woods and encountering a vampire family.

Track listings

European CD single
 "At Night" (original edit) – 3:10
 "At Night" (Kid Crème Funksta mix) – 8:04

UK CD and cassette single
 "At Night" (original edit) – 3:10
 "At Night" (Mousse T.'s Feel Much Better edit) – 4:45
 "At Night" (Kid Crème club mix) – 5:00
 "At Night" (Afterlife remix) – 5:45

UK 12-inch single
A1. "At Night" (original mix) – 6:40
AA1. "At Night" (Mousse T.'s Feel Much Better mix) – 6:05
AA2. "At Night" (Kid Crème club mix) – 6:33

Australian CD single
 "At Night" (original edit) – 3:10
 "At Night" (Mousse T.'s Feel Much Better mix) – 7:25
 "At Night" (Kid Crème Funksta mix) – 8:04
 "At Night" (Alan Braxe remix) – 6:30

Digital EP
 "At Night" (club mix) – 6:44
 "At Night" (Kid Crème Remix) – 8:05
 "At Night" (Mousse T.'s Feel Much Better mix) – 7:24
 "At Night" (Alan Braxe remix) – 6:30
 "At Night" (accapella) – 0:53

Charts

Weekly charts

Year-end charts

Certifications

Release history

References

2002 debut singles
2002 songs
English-language Swiss songs
Sony Music Australia singles